The Alaska congressional election of 1968 was held on Tuesday, November 5, 1968. The term of the state's sole Representative to the United States House of Representatives expired on January 3, 1969. The winning candidate would serve a two-year term from January 3, 1969, to January 3, 1971. Incumbent Republican Representative Howard W. Pollock defeated Democratic State Senator Nick Begich, by a margin of 8.4%, winning re-election to a second term.

General election

Results

See also 
 1968 United States Senate election in Alaska

References

1968
Alaska
United States House of Representatives